Richard M. Perloff is an American academic. He is professor of communication at Cleveland State University, where he has taught since 1979. He has written on persuasion, on political communication, on the psychology of perception of the effects of mass media, and on the third-person effect.

Publications

Perloff's published work includes:

 The Dynamics of Persuasion. Hillsdale, New Jersey: Lawrence Erlbaum, 1993
Fifth edition, London; New York: Routledge, 2014.
 Political Communication: Politics, Press, and Public in America. Mahwah, New Jersey: Lawrence Erlbaum Associates, 1998.
 Persuading People to have Safer Sex: Applications of Social Science to the AIDS Crisis. Mahwah, New Jersey: Lawrence Erlbaum Associates, 2001.
 The Dynamics of Political Communication: Media and Politics in a Digital Age. Abingdon; New York: Routledge, 2014.

In 2006 he was editor of a special issue of American Behavioral Scientist on racial health-care disparities and communication.

References

University of Michigan College of Literature, Science, and the Arts alumni
University of Pittsburgh alumni
Living people
University of Wisconsin–Madison alumni
Cleveland State University faculty
1951 births
University of Wisconsin–Madison School of Journalism & Mass Communication alumni